KNEI-FM (103.5 MHz) is a country radio station licensed to Waukon, Iowa, serving portions of Minnesota, Iowa & Wisconsin.

References

External links

NEI-FM
Country radio stations in the United States